Fahad Al Rashidi may refer to:

 Fahad Al-Rashidi (footballer, born 1984), Kuwaiti football player
 Fahad Al-Rashidi (footballer, born 1991), Saudi football player
 Fahad Al-Rashidi (footballer, born 1997), Saudi football player